Leonid Alexandrovich Umansky (July 23, 1890 – April 3, 1957) was an American electrical engineer of Russian origin and a recipient of the IEEE Edison Medal for "outstanding contribution to the electrification of industry through the application of electrical machines, devices, and systems to automatic process machinery; and for his inspiration, leadership, and teaching of men in this work".

References

External links
 Edison Medal

1890 births
1957 deaths
IEEE Edison Medal recipients
Emigrants from the Russian Empire to the United States